Monica-Suneta Csengeri (born ) is a Romanian weightlifter, competing in the 48 kg category and representing Romania at international competitions. Competed at world championships, most recently at the 2015 World Weightlifting Championships. In 2018 she tested positive for Ephedrine and was banned until 2019 by the International Weightlifting Federation.

Major results

References

1996 births
Living people
Romanian female weightlifters
Place of birth missing (living people)
European Weightlifting Championships medalists
21st-century Romanian women